Show on Shows is a Canadian biographical television series which aired on CBC Television from 1964 to 1965.

Premise
This series featured profiles and contributions of people involved in various artistic fields such as Ralph Allen, Rita Greer Allen (Encore, One of a Kind), Paul Almond, Marie-Claire Blais (author, playwright), Barry Callaghan (writer), Sorel Etrog (sculptor), Timothy Findley (writer), LeRoi Jones (poet, writer), George Luscombe (artistic director, Toronto Workshop Productions), Marya Mannes (author, critic), Ross McLean, Merle Shain (writer), Michael Snow (mixed media artist), Raymond Souster (poet), John Updike (writer) and Joyce Wieland (mixed media artist).

Scheduling
This half-hour series was broadcast Sundays at 5:00 p.m. from 1 November to 27 December 1964, then another run from 4 April to 27 June 1965.

References

External links
 

CBC Television original programming
1964 Canadian television series debuts
1965 Canadian television series endings
Black-and-white Canadian television shows